Maryanthe Elizabeth Malliaris is a professor of mathematics at the University of Chicago, a specialist in model theory.

Early life and education
Malliaris is the daughter of Anastasios G. (Tassos) Malliaris, an economist at Loyola University Chicago, and Mary E. Malliaris, Professor of Information Systems at Loyola.

As an undergraduate at Harvard College, Malliaris wrote for the Harvard Crimson, contributed a biography of Polish sociologist Zygmunt Bauman to the Encyclopedia of Postmodernism, and worked for a startup called Zaps.

She graduated from Harvard in 2001 with a concentration in mathematics, and earned her PhD in 2009 from the University of California, Berkeley under the supervision of Thomas Scanlon. Her dissertation was Persistence and Regularity in Unstable Model Theory.

Research
In her dissertation and postdoctoral research, Malliaris studied unstable model theory and its connection, via characteristic sequences, to graph theoretic concepts such as the Szemerédi regularity lemma.

She is also known for two joint papers with Saharon Shelah connecting topology, set theory, and model theory.
In this work, Malliaris and Shelah used Keisler's order, a construction from model theory,
to prove the equality between two cardinal characteristics of the continuum, 𝖕 and 𝖙, which are greater than the smallest infinite cardinal and less than or equal to the cardinality of the continuum.
This resolved a problem in set theory that had been open for fifty years.
Their work also solved another problem that had been open almost as long, by characterizing the maximal theories in Keisler's order.

Awards and honors
Malliaris won a Kurt Gödel Research Prize in 2010 for her work in unstable model theory.

In 2017, she and Saharon Shelah shared the Hausdorff Medal of the European Set Theory Society for their joint papers.

She was an invited speaker at the 2018 International Congress of Mathematicians.

Selected publications

References

External links
Home page

Year of birth missing (living people)
Living people
21st-century American mathematicians
American women mathematicians
Model theorists
University of California, Berkeley alumni
University of Chicago faculty
The Harvard Crimson people
21st-century women mathematicians
Hausdorff Medal winners
21st-century American women